Louis-Charles Boileau (1837 - 1914) was a French architect.

He was the son of French architect Louis-Auguste Boileau and the father of French architect Louis-Hippolyte Boileau.. Louis-Charles Boileau was a partner in the design of an extension of Le Bon Marché department store in Paris, France.

References

1837 births
1914 deaths
19th-century French architects